The cinnamon neopipo or cinnamon manakin-tyrant (Neopipo cinnamomea) is a species of bird in the family Tyrannidae. It is the only member of the genus Neopipo.

It is found in Brazil, Colombia, Ecuador, French Guiana, Guyana, Peru, Suriname, and Venezuela.
Its natural habitats are subtropical or tropical moist lowland forests and subtropical or tropical dry shrubland.

References

cinnamon neopipo
Birds of the Amazon Basin
Birds of the Guianas
cinnamon neopipo
Taxonomy articles created by Polbot